The 1971 Kansas State Wildcats football team represented Kansas State University in the 1971 NCAA University Division football season.  The team's head football coach was Vince Gibson.  The Wildcats played their home games in KSU Stadium.  1971 saw the wildcats finish with a record of 5–6, and a 2–5 record in Big Eight Conference play.

Schedule

Roster

References

Kansas State
Kansas State Wildcats football seasons
Kansas State Wildcats football